West Central German belongs to the Central, High German dialect family of German. Its dialects are Franconian and comprise the parts of the Rhinelandic continuum located south of the Benrath line isogloss, including the following sub-families:
 Central Franconian
 Ripuarian, spoken in North Rhine-Westphalia (including ) and German-speaking Belgium and a small edge in the south of the Dutch province of Limbourg.
 Moselle Franconian in Rhineland-Palatinate, Saarland and France
 Luxembourgish (or ) in Luxembourg, Belgium and France
 Hunsrik, spoken in Brazil and derived from the  dialect of Moselle Franconian
 Rhine Franconian 
 Palatinate Franconian, spoken in Rhineland-Palatinate
 Lorraine Franconian in the French region of Lorraine
 Bukovina German in Bukovina (extinct)
 Pennsylvania German in historical communities in North America, especially Pennsylvania
 Hessian in Hesse and the Rhenish Hesse region of Rhineland-Palatinate
 North Hessian
 Central Hessian
 East Hessian
 South Hessian

Apart from West Central German on the southern edge and in south-east Franconian dialects are turning to Upper German. This transition area between Central German and Upper German is captured by the dialect families of South Franconian German and East Franconian German, colloquially miscalled Franconian as dialects of this sub-family are spoken all over Franconia.

West Central German was spoken in several settlements throughout America, for example in the Amana Colonies.

See also
East Central German
Limburgish language
High German consonant shift

References

Central German languages
German dialects
Languages of Germany
Languages of Luxembourg
Languages of France
Languages of Belgium
Languages of the Netherlands
German language in the United States